was a town located in Kuga District, Yamaguchi Prefecture, Japan.

As of 2003, the town had an estimated population of 3,583 and a density of 298.33 persons per km². The total area was 12.01 km².

On February 21, 2005, Ōbatake was merged into the expanded city of Yanai.

External links
 Yanai official website 

Dissolved municipalities of Yamaguchi Prefecture